Borrowash railway station was a station at Borrowash in Derbyshire.

History

It was built in 1839 for the Midland Counties Railway, which shortly joined the North Midland Railway and the Birmingham and Derby Junction Railway to form the Midland Railway. This line is now part of the Midland Main Line between Long Eaton and Derby

It was at first only a temporary building in the cutting. Its first station master was a Mr. Portlock.

During the building of the line it was necessary to cut through an Anglo-Saxon barrow. It may have been the scene of a massacre for many skulls were found, of people aged from 18 to 60, cloven by Danish battleaxes, some being presented to Derby Museum.

A new station was built in 1871, for a time known as Borrowash for Ockbrook,  it closed to passengers in 1966 and was demolished in 1994.

The original  station became a private house and  survives today. The remains of a flight of steps to the former platform can still be made out.

Station masters

Mr. Portlock ca. 1839
Thomas Dobson 1840 - ca. 1857
J.C. Hays until 1860 (afterwards station master at Langley Mill)
William Richard Boddington 1861 - 1876
John Frederick Rose 1876 - 1884 
Robert Herbert 1885  - 1889 (formerly station master at Mountsorrel, afterwards station master at Dursley)
Richard Foskett 1889 - 1899 (formerly station master at Blackwell, afterwards station master at Hemel Hempsted)
Charles Ravenhall 1899 - 1900 (afterwards station master at Kegworth)
George Pinkerton 1900 - 1915 (formerly station master at Shirehampton)
Arthur Fourt 1915 - 1922 (formerly station master at Draycott, afterwards station master at Sileby)
Noel Manton ca. 1925 - 1933 (afterwards station master at Wilnecote)
Christopher Bell ca. 1934 ca. 1940
C.C. Clarke from 1943  (formerly station master at Elford)
G. Adrard ca. 1953
Roy Marriott ca. 1957 until closing.

References

Bibliography
The Nottingham and Derby Railway Companion, (1839) Republished 1979 with foreword by J.B.Radford, Derbyshire Record Society
Higginson, M, (1989) The Midland Counties Railway: A Pictorial Survey, Derby: Midland Railway Trust.

External links
Borrowash railway station at Wikimapia.
"Picture the Past" (DMAG001929) Borrowash Station c1905.
"Picture the Past" (DMAG001929) Borrowash Station c1910.
"Picture the Past" (DMAG001928) Borrowash Station c1910.
"Picture the Past" (DCER001189) Borrowash Station c1940.

Buildings and structures demolished in 1994
Disused railway stations in Derbyshire
Railway stations in Great Britain opened in 1839
Railway stations in Great Britain closed in 1966
Former Midland Railway stations
Beeching closures in England
Borough of Erewash